The Brown–Rhode Island football rivalry is an American college football rivalry between the Brown Bears and Rhode Island Rams.

History
They have met 106 times. They have played annually since 1909, except for 1918, 1923–24, 1943–45, 1992, and 2020. Since 1981, the Governor's Cup is given to the winner of the game. The Brown-Rhode Island game is played in late September or early October, and the venue alternates between Brown Stadium and Meade Stadium. Brown leads the series 73–31–2, but since the introduction of the Governor's Cup, the series is much closer, with Rhode Island leading 21–19.

Game results

See also  
 List of NCAA college football rivalry games
 List of most-played college football series in NCAA Division I
 Ocean State Cup

References

Brown Bears football
College football rivalries in the United States
Rhode Island Rams football
Recurring sporting events established in 1909
1909 establishments in Rhode Island